Oisín is a legendary poet and demigod from Irish mythology. The name or its variant Oisin may also refer to:
Oisin (given name)
Oisín, an Irish short documentary film
"Oisín", a song by God Is an Astronaut from the album Epitaph